Below is a list of newspapers in France.

National

Daily 

 Online newspapers
 Mediapart (internet only, investigative journalism)
 La Tribune (switched to internet only since 2012, economics)
 Slate
 Atlantico
 Contrepoints

 Free newspapers
 20 Minutes
 Direct Matin

Weekly 

 Challenges (economy)
 Charlie Hebdo (satirical news magazine, left-wing)
 Courrier International (translated articles from press worldwide, centre-left)
 Le Canard enchaîné (satirical newspaper, investigative journalism, generally left-wing)
 L'Express (centre-right)
 France Dimanche (celebrity news magazine) 
 Le Journal du dimanche (news, culture, leisure)
 Le Monde Libertaire (anarcho-communist weekly)
 L'Obs (news magazine, centre-left)
 Le Point (news magazine, right-wing)
 Marianne (news magazine, left-wing)
 Paris-Match (headline news and celebrity lifestyle features)
 Télérama (culture)
 VSD (news, celebrity and leisure magazine)

Monthly 

 Le Monde Diplomatique (left-wing to far-left)

Every four years 

 La Bougie du Sapeur (satirical, every February 29)

English-language 

 The Connexion
 International New York Times (is based in Paris)
 The Local (online)
 Mediapart (English edition)
 Le Monde Diplomatique (translated edition)

Regional

Daily 
 Centre Presse (Aveyron)
 Centre Presse (Vienne)
 Charente Libre (Nouvelle-Aquitaine)
 Corse-Matin (Corsica)
 Dordogne libre (Dordogne)
 Éclair Pyrénées (Pyrénées-Atlantiques)
 France-Guyane (French Guiana)
 France-Antilles (Martinique, Guadeloupe)
 L'Alsace-Le Pays (Alsace, Franche-Comté)
 L'Ardennais (Ardennes)
 L'Écho républicain (Eure-et-Loir, Yvelines)
 L'Est Républicain (Franche-Comté, Lorraine)
 L'Est-Éclair (Aube)
 L'Éveil de la Haute-Loire (Haute-Loire)
 L'Indépendant (Pyrénées-Orientales, Aude)
 L'Union (Marne, Aisne, Ardennes)
 L'Yonne républicaine (Yonne)
 La Dépêche du Midi (Midi-Pyrénées)
 La Dépêche de Tahiti (French Polynesia)
 La Marseillaise (Bouches-du-Rhône, Alpes-de-Haute-Provence, Var, Vaucluse, Gard, Hérault)
 La Montagne (Auvergne)
 La Nouvelle République des Pyrénées (Hautes-Pyrénées)
 La Nouvelle République du Centre-Ouest (Centre, Poitou-Charentes)
 La Presse de la Manche (Manche)
 La Presse de Guyane (French Guiana)
 La Provence (Provence-Alpes-Côte d'Azur)
 La République des Pyrénées (Nouvelle-Aquitaine)
 La République du Centre (Loiret)
 La Voix du Nord (Nord-Pas de Calais)
 Le Berry Républicain (Centre-Val de Loire)
 Le Bien Public (Côte-d'Or)
 Le Courrier de l'Ouest (Maine-et-Loire, Deux-Sèvres)
 Le Courrier Picard (Picardy)
 Le Dauphiné Libéré (Dauphiné, Savoy)
 Le Havre libre (Seine-Maritime)
 Le Havre presse (Seine-Maritime)
 Le Journal de l'île de la Réunion (Réunion)
 Le Journal de la Haute-Marne (Haute-Marne)
 Le Journal de Saône et Loire (Burgundy)
 Le Journal du Centre (Centre)
 Le Maine libre (Sarthe)
 Le Parisien (Île-de-France, Oise)
 Le Petit Bleu d'Agen (Lot-et-Garonne)
 Le Populaire du Centre (Creuse, Haute-Vienne)
 Le Progrès (Auvergne, Burgundy, Franche-Comté, Rhône-Alpes)
 Le Quotidien de la Réunion (Réunion)
 Le Républicain Lorrain (Lorraine)
 Le Télégramme de Brest (Brittany)
 Les Dernières Nouvelles d'Alsace (Alsace)
 Les Nouvelles Calédoniennes (New Caledonia)
 Libération Champagne (Aube)
 Midi Libre (Languedoc-Roussillon, Midi-Pyrénées)
 Nice-Matin (Provence-Alpes-Côte d'Azur)
 Nord éclair (Nord)
 Nord Littoral (Pas-de-Calais)
 Ouest-France (Brittany, Lower Normandy, Pays de la Loire)
 Paris-Normandie (Normandy)
 Presse-Océan (Pays de la Loire)
 Sud Ouest (Nouvelle-Aquitaine)
 Var-Matin (Var)
 Vosges Matin (Vosges)

Weekly 
 Eure Infos (Eure)
 Journal de la Corse (Corsica)
 L'Abeille de la Ternoise (Pas-de-Calais, Somme)
 L'Action républicaine (Eure, Eure-et-Loir)
 L'Auvergnat de Paris (Île-de-France)
 L'Avenir (Charente)
 L'Aveyronnais (Aveyron)
 L'Éclaireur (Loire-Atlantique)
 L'Écho charitois (Nièvre)
 L'Écho de la Lys (Pas-de-Calais)
 L'Écho de la Presqu'île (Loire-Atlantique)
 L'Écho-Le Régional (Val-d'Oise)
 L'Éclaireur Brayon (Oise, Seine-Maritime)
 L'Éclaireur du Gâtinais (Loiret)
 L'Essor savoyard (Ain, Haute-Savoie, Savoie)
 L'Éveil de Pont-Audemer (Eure)
 L'Éveil hebdo (Haute-Loire)
 L'Éveil normand (Eure)
 L'Hebdo du vendredi (Marne)
 L'Impartial (Eure, Oise)
 L'Indicateur des Flandres (Flanders)
 L'Info éco (Vienne)
 L'Informateur (Seine-Maritime)
 L'Indépendant du Haut-Jura (Jura)
 L'Observateur de Beauvais (Oise)
 L'Observateur de l'Arrageois (Pas-de-Calais)
 L'Observateur de l'Aube (Aube)
 L'Observateur de l'Avesnois (Nord)
 L'Observateur du Cambrésis (Nord)
 L'Observateur du Douaisis (Nord)
 L'Observateur du Valenciennois (Nord)
 L'Opinion Indépendante (Haute-Garonne)
 L'Orne combattante (Orne, Calvados)
 L'Orne Hebdo (Orne)
 La Concorde (Deux-Sèvres)
 La Corse Votre Hebdo (Corsica)
 La Dépêche du pays de Bray (Oise, Seine-Maritime)
 La Gazette de Besançon (Doubs)
 La Gazette de la Loire (Loire)
 La Gazette de la Manche (Manche)
 La Gazette de Montpellier (Hérault)
 La Gazette de Thiers et d'Ambert (Puy-de-Dôme)
 La Gazette du Val d'Oise (Val-d'Oise)
 La Manche libre (Lower Normandy)
 La Marne (Seine-et-Marne)
 La Presse de Gray (Haute-Saône)
 La Presse de Vesoul (Haute-Saône)
 La République de Seine-et-Marne (Seine-et-Marne)
 La Ruche (Haute-Loire)
 La Savoie (Savoie)
 La Semaine dans le Boulonnais (Boulonnais)
 La Semaine de l'Allier (Allier)
 La Semaine des Ardennes (Ardennes)
 La Semaine du Roussillon (Pyrénées-Orientales)
 La Tribune républicaine de Bellegarde (Ain)
 La Vie corrézienne (Corrèze)
 La Vie quercynoise (Lot)
 La Vie nouvelle (Savoie)
 La Voix - Le Bocage (Calvados)
 La Voix du Cantal (Cantal)
 La Voix du Sancerrois (Cher)
 Le Bulletin de Darnetal (Seine-Maritime)
 Le Châtillonnais et l’Auxois (Côte-d'Or)
 Le Confolentais (Charente)
 Le Courrier français (Charente, Charente-Maritime, Dordogne, Gironde, Landes, Lot-et-Garonne, Tarn-et-Garonne, Vendée, Loire-Atlantique, Vienne)
 Le Courrier cauchois (Seine-Maritime)
 Le Courrier de l'Eure (Eure)
 Le Courrier de Mantes (Yvelines)
 Le Courrier des Yvelines (Yvelines)
 Le Courrier du pays de Retz (Pays de Retz)
 Le Courrier du Loiret (Loiret)
 Le Courrier vendéen (Vendée)
 Le Crestois (Drôme)
 Le Démocrate de l'Aisne (Aisne)
 Le Démocrate vernonnais (Eure)
 Le Journal d'Abbeville (Somme)
 Le Journal d'Elbeuf (Eure, Seine-Maritime)
 Le Journal de l'Orne (Orne)
 Le Journal de Civray et du Sud-Vienne (Vienne)
 Le Journal de Ham (Somme)
 Le Journal de Gien (Loiret)
 Le Journal des Flandres (Flanders)
 Le Messager (Haute-Savoie)
 Le Nouvelliste (Haute-Vienne)
 Le Patriote Côte d'Azur (Alpes-Maritimes)
 Le Pays gessien (Ain)
 Le Pays malouin (Ille-et-Vilaine)
 Le Perche (Orne)
 Le Petit Bleu des Côtes d'Armor (Côtes-d'Armor)
 Le Petit Solognot  (Cher, Loir-et-Cher, Loiret)
 Le Régional de Cosne (Nièvre)
 Le Réveil de Neufchâtel (Oise, Seine-Maritime)
 Le Réveil du Vivarais (Loire, Ardèche, Isère, Drôme )
 Le Réveil normand (Orne, Eure)
 Le Saint-Affricain (Aveyron)
 Le Trégor (Côtes-d'Armor)
 Les Nouvelles de Falaise (Calvados)
 Liberté Hebdo (Nord)
 Lozère nouvelle (Lozère)
 Mayotte Hebdo (Mayotte)
 Marseille l'Hebdo (Bouches-du-Rhône)
 Oise Hebdo (Oise)
 Réussir le Périgord (Dordogne)
 Toutes les nouvelles (Yvelines)
 La Voix de l'Ain (Ain)
 Voix du Jura (Jura)
 Voix du Midi (Midi)
  (Lyon, Metz, Nancy, Nantes, Strasbourg)
 Ya ! (Finistère)

Biweekly 
 La Renaissance - Le Bessin (Calvados)
 Le Pays briard (Seine-et-Marne)
 Les Informations dieppoises (Seine-Maritime)

Monthly 
 Bretons (Morbihan)
 L'Essentiel des Pays de Savoie (Savoie, Haute-Savoie, Isère, Ain)
 Le Mensuel de Rennes (Ille-et-Vilaine)
 Le Peuple breton (Brittany)
 Mémento (Réunion)
 Métropole, le mensuel du Var (Var)
 Normandie Magazine (Normandy)
 Particule (Ille-et-Vilaine)
 Poly (Alsace, Lorraine, Franche-Comté)

Bimonthly 
 Bretagne Magazine (Brittany)

Quarterly 
 L'Anjou
 La Galipote (Auvergne)
 Le Berry
 Le Journal de la Sologne (Centre-Val de Loire)
 Les Saisons d'Alsace (Alsace)
 Le Magazine de la Touraine
 Massif Central (newspaper)
 Patrimoine normand (Normandy)
 Xaintonge, le jhornau des Charentais

Former newspapers 

 L'Ami du peuple, founded by Marat
 La Citoyenne, 1881–1891 (feminist)
 Combat, 1944–1974, founded during the Resistance, hosted articles by Camus, Sartre, Malraux
 Le Courrier français, 1884–1914 (conservative)
 Le Journal des débats, 1789–1944 (conservative)
 L'Express du Midi, 1891–1938 (conservative and royalist)
 La Gazette, 1631–1915, first French weekly, founded by Renaudot, became the mouthpiece of the Legitimist monarchists
 Le Globe, 1824–1832, founded by the republican and socialist Leroux, mouthpiece of the Saint-Simonists starting in 1830
 Je suis partout, 1930–1944, far-right newspaper, Collaborationist during the Vichy era
 Le Journal, 1892–1944
 Le Matin, 1884–1944
 Le National, 1830–1851 (liberal, founded by Thiers and Carrel)
 Naye Prese, 1934–1993
 Paris-Soir, 1923–1944
 Le Père Duchesne, 1790–1794, edited by Hébert
 Le Père Duchesne (other newspapers)
 Le Petit Parisien, 1876–1944
 Le Temps, 1861–1942, compromised by collaboration during Vichy regime, replaced as the newspaper of record by the newly created Le Monde
Marianne (magazine: 1932-1940) illustrative, left leaning
 La Voix des Femmes, 1848–1852 (feminist)
 La Voix des femmes, 1917-1937 (feminist)

German-language
 , 1933-1936 (German-language daily for German exiles in France) 
 Pariser Tageszeitung (see ), 1936-1940 (Anti-Hitler daily for expatriates)

Ottoman Turkish
 Mizan

See also 

 History of French newspapers
 History of newspapers and magazines#France
 Media of France
 Telecommunications in France

References

Further reading 

 Blackburn, George M. "Paris Newspapers and the American Civil War." Illinois Historical Journal (1991): 177–193. in JSTOR
 Censer, Jack Richard. Press and politics in pre-revolutionary France (Univ of California Press, 1987)
 Chalaby, Jean K. "Twenty years of contrast: The French and British press during the inter-war period." European Journal of Sociology 37.01 (1996): 143–159. 1919-39
 Collins, Irene. The government and the newspaper press in France, 1814-1881 (Oxford University Press, 1959)
 Collins, Ross F., and E. M. Palmegiano, eds. The Rise of Western Journalism 1815-1914: Essays on the Press in Australia, Canada, France, Germany, Great Britain and the United States (2007), Chapter on France by Ross Collins
 Cragin, Thomas J. "The Failings of Popular News Censorship in Nineteenth-Century France." Book History 4.1 (2001): 49–80. online
 Edelstein, Melvin. "La Feuille villageoise, the Revolutionary Press, and the Question of Rural Political Participation." French Historical Studies (1971): 175–203. in JSTOR
 Eisendrath, Charles R. "Politics and Journalism--French Connection." Columbia Journalism Review 18.1 (1979): 58-61
 Freiberg, J. W. The French press: class, state, and ideology (Praeger Publishers, 1981)
 Goldstein, Robert Justin. "Fighting French Censorship, 1815-1881." French Review (1998): 785–796. in JSTOR
 Gough, Hugh. The newspaper press in the French Revolution (Taylor & Francis, 1988)
 Isser, Natalie. The Second Empire and the Press: A Study of Government-Inspired Brochures on French Foreign Policy in Their Propaganda Milieu (Springer, 1974)
 Kerr, David S. Caricature and French Political Culture 1830-1848: Charles Philipon and the Illustrated Press (Oxford University Press, 2000)
 Thogmartin, Clyde. The national daily press of France (Birmingham Alabama: Summa Publications, Inc., 1998), 370pp
 Trinkle, Dennis A. The Napoleonic press: the public sphere and oppositionary journalism (Edwin Mellen Pr, 2002)
 Weigle, Clifford. "The Paris Press from 1920 to 1940" Journalism Quarterly (1941) 18: 376–84.
 Weigle, Clifford. "The Rise and Fall of the Havas News Agency" Journalism Quarterly (1942) 19:277-86
 Williams, Roger Lawrence. Henri Rochefort, prince of the gutter press (Scribner, 1966)
 Zerner, Elisabeth H. "Rumors in Paris Newspapers," Public Opinion Quarterly (1946) 10#3 pp. 382–391 in JSTOR In summer 1945

External links 

  Regular French Press Review - Radio France International
 Brander Mathews, "Notes on Parisian Newspapers," The Century 35 (December 1, 1887): 200-12
 Actualités françaises de France - WorldNewsList, Journaux français
 "The daily press in France," compared to the press in the UK, on About-France.com
 English translations of articles from French newspapers at nonprofit WorldMeets.US
 Le Guide Presse : French press directory, index of all French newspapers and magazines

France

Newspapers